Marco Chiudinelli and Marius Copil were the defending champions but chose not to defend their title.

Scott Clayton and Jonny O'Mara won the title after Denys Molchanov and Sergiy Stakhovsky withdrew from the final.

Seeds

Draw

References
 Main Draw

Türk Telecom İzmir Cup - Doubles
2017 Singles